WVBL-LP (99.9 FM) was a radio station broadcasting a religious radio format. Licensed to Salem, West Virginia, United States, the station was owned by Miracle Meadows School.

WVBL-LP's license was cancelled by the Federal Communications Commission on December 11, 2013, due to the station having been silent since 2011.

References

External links
 

VBL-LP
VBL-LP
Radio stations disestablished in 2013
Defunct radio stations in the United States
Defunct religious radio stations in the United States
2013 disestablishments in West Virginia
VBL-LP